The maternity package is a kit granted by the Finnish social security institution Kela, to all expectant or adoptive parents who live in Finland or are covered by the Finnish social security system. The package contains children's clothes and other necessary items, such as nappies, bedding, cloth, gauze towels and child-care products. It was first issued in 1938 to parents with a low income, and contained a blanket, crib sheets, diapers, and fabric which parents could use to make clothing for the baby.

Since 1949 it has been given to all mothers-to-be, provided they visited a doctor or municipal pre-natal clinic before the end of their fourth month of pregnancy, and the pregnancy has lasted at least 154 days. The contents of the package are updated approximately every year. A mother may choose to take the maternity package, or a cash grant of 170 euros, but 95% of Finnish mothers choose the box because it's worth significantly more. Between 2006 and 2019, the total maternity grant program cost an average of 10.3 million euros per year, with 7 million being spent on maternity packages and 3.3 million given out as cash benefits or adoption grants. The maternity packages each year cost between 183 and 223 euros, averaging 190 euros each over the full 14-year period; an average of 37,000 are given out each year.

Following a BBC story in June 2013, the baby box began to receive international attention. Similar packages, commercial or state-sponsored, are being trialled around the world. Private companies have started selling packages purporting to be the "Finnish baby box" or similar to it, but the original boxes are not sold commercially.

Package

In 1949, the box given was standard to all expectant mothers who visited a doctor before the fourth month of pregnancy per the Finnish Maternity Grants Act. A baby bottle was added to the package, but was removed in later packages to encourage breastfeeding. The requirement to visit a doctor as a prerequisite to receiving the package was done in order to ensure that the woman received adequate prenatal care. The maternity package can either be applied for online, on Kela's website, or by completing and returning a form.

The current package contents include bodysuits, a sleeping bag, outdoor gear, bathing products for the baby, nappies and cream, bedding, a hooded bath towel, nail scissors, hairbrush, toothbrush, wash cloth, muslin squares, a picture book, teething toy, bra pads, and condoms. It also contains a small mattress, allowing the box containing the package to become a crib in which many newborns have their first naps. Condoms are included by way of precaution, not as a discouragement, as a new pregnancy is possible within a few weeks of childbirth and many parents wish to have a little time between the births of their children.

The maternity package is not a commercial product, and therefore Kela cannot sell it. Prince William and Catherine, Duchess of Cambridge received a maternity package as a gift from Kela in 2013. Crown Princess Victoria and Prince Daniel of Sweden were given one in 2012.

Content of the package in 2017

In 2017 the box contained following items:

 Snowsuit / sleeping bag 
 Insulated mittens and booties
 Sleeping bag / blanket 
 Light-weight overall with hood 68–74 cm
 Wool-blend coverall 68–74 cm
 Wool cap
 Balaclava hood 
 Cap
 College overall / jumpsuit 62–68 cm
 Romper suit 
 Wrap around body suit 50–56 cm
 Bodysuit with extender 62–68 cm
 Bodysuit 68–74 cm
 Bodysuit 62–68 cm
 2 × Wrap around bodysuit 50–56 cm
 2 × Leggings 62–68 cm
 2 × Leggings 68–74 cm
 2 × Footed leggings 50–56 cm
 Tights 62–68 cm
 Socks and mittens 19–21
 Socks 19–21
 Sleeping bag / nightdress 62–68 cm
 Bedding and linen
 Blanket, off-white 
 Duvet cover with pattern of baby footprints on green background 
 White sheet 
 Protector 90 cm × 150 cm (can be used, for instance, as protection for the mattress)
 Mattress 
 Pocket nappy and cotton gauze insert
 Towel 
 Personal care items (bra pads, nail scissors, toothbrush, digital thermometer, talcum powder, nipple cream, condoms (6pcs), lubricant, sanitary towels, bath thermometer, hairbrush)
 Feeding bib
 Drooling bib / scarf
 First book titled "Lystileikit vauvan kanssa” in Finnish and Swedish
 Cuddly toy / comfort blanket

Research
International curiosity surrounding the Finnish baby box is often associated with the fact that Finland has one of the lowest infant mortality rates in the world. However, there is no evidence that the baby box has had any effect on infant mortality in Finland. Retrospective studies would be difficult due to design or implement given the lack of records from the historical period in which the baby box was introduced, and a current study would be complicated by the ubiquitous use of the baby box in Finland, today. However, it is possible to analyze new programs in other countries that have been inspired by or are similar to the Finnish baby box program. 

A 2020 report from Tampere University, published by Kela, reported that over 60 countries use some form of a baby "box" maternity package. After in-depth interviews with 29 of these 60 programs, researchers found that the baby box concept has been highly adapted to fit many cultures and has been used with the aim to promote various messages, such as safe sleep or breastfeeding, in contexts from rural prisons to capital cities. The report also addressed popular topics surrounding the baby box, such as Sudden Infant Death Syndrome (SIDS), as well as the history of the Finnish baby box and its connection to larger social support systems.  

In 2017, an experimental study was conducted in the United States on the use of US baby boxes (a.k.a., "cardboard bassinets"), in combination with safe sleep education, for reducing bed-sharing, which is a risk factor for SIDS and sleep-related deaths (SRD). Researchers at Temple University Hospital assigned study participants (i.e., mother-infant dyads) to one of the following conditions for postpartum hospital discharge: standard hospital discharge instructions; standard instructions plus additional safe infant sleep education based on the AAP safe infant sleep recommendations; or both types of instruction plus a gifted baby box from The Baby Box Company. The researchers concluded that the third condition (i.e., both types of instruction plus a gifted baby box) reduced the rate of bed-sharing during the first week of the infant's life (as self-reported by the participating mothers), particularly for exclusively breastfeeding mother-infant dyads.

Similar programs in other countries

Argentina

In July 2015, Argentina's Ministry of Health under then-president Cristina Fernandez de Kirchner introduced "Plan Qunita" which distributes maternity packages to parents of newborn babies. At the rollout of the program, about 144,000 Qunitas were issued.

Australia

In Australia, the state of New South Wales began a program providing a baby bundle to the parents of every baby born from 1 January 2019. The bundle contains picture books, mats, a first aid kit, a sleeping bag, thermometers, and consumable child-care products such as cloths and wipes, with a total retail value of AU$300.

Similarly, the state of Victoria began a baby bundle program starting from July 2019, for all first-time parents and carers.

Canada

In 2016, a program modeled on the Finnish baby box concept was launched in the northern territory of Nunavut, as a way of combatting its high infant mortality rate.

Ireland

A similar scheme has been proposed in Ireland. The program will be piloted starting February 2023 with 500 Little Baby Bundles that will be delivered to expectant parents completing a form at the pilot hospitals of Rotunda Hospital in Dublin and University Hospital Waterford following their 20-week scan. The pilot bundle has an estimated value of €300.

Scotland
A similar scheme was introduced in Scotland in 2017. After a three-month pilot scheme in Clackmannanshire and Orkney, the Scottish "baby box" began to be issued to all parents with newborns in summer 2017, with over 52,000 such boxes issued in the first twelve months of the programme.

Sweden

In Sweden, startboxes are offered by some stores that sell baby products as well as pharmacies and some hospitals. Many new parents actually benefit from multiple boxes from companies trying to win new customers.

United States

In the summer of 2017, it was announced that the U.S. state of New Jersey would become the first state in the country to adopt the baby box program.

See also
Layette, a collection of infant clothing prepared (made, bought, or given) during pregnancy

Notes

References

External links
Maternity package - current maternity package
Edelliset äitiyspakkaukset - maternity package items by year, 1994-2016
Historical photos, Historical photos of the maternity package

Package
Finnish inventions